Ermelino Matarazzo may refer to:
 Subprefecture of Ermelino Matarazzo
 Ermelino Matarazzo (district of São Paulo)